Traffic management is a key branch within logistics. It concerns the planning,** control and purchasing of transport services needed to physically move vehicles (for example aircraft, road vehicles, rolling stock and watercraft) and freight.

Traffic management is implemented by people working with different job titles in different branches:

 Within freight and cargo logistics: traffic manager, assessment of hazardous and awkward materials, carrier choice and fees, demurrage, documentation, expediting, freight consolidation, insurance, reconsignment and tracking
 Within air traffic management: air traffic controller
 Within rail traffic management: rail traffic controller, train dispatcher or signalman
 Within road traffic management: traffic controller

Traffic Control Management is the design, auditing and implementation of traffic control plans at worksites and civil infrastructure projects. Traffic Management can include: flagging, lane closures, detours, full freeway closures, pedestrian access, traffic plans, traffic management vehicles and sidewalk closures.

See also
 Air traffic control, a service provided by ground-based controllers who direct aircraft
 Road traffic control, directing vehicular and pedestrian traffic around a construction zone, accident or other road disruption
 Traffic control in shipping lanes
 Urban (peak-hour) traffic management

References

Beacon Traffic Management https://www.beacontm.co.uk/

External links

 
Business terms
Management by type